Edward Berry (1706-1760) was a British stage actor. He was a long-standing member of the Drury Lane company, appearing frequently with David Garrick.

Selected roles
 Hobinol in The Village Opera by Charles Johnson (1729)
 Pantomine in Bayes's Opera by Gabriel Odingsells (1730)
 Butler in The Devil to Pay by Charles Coffey (1731)
 Gentleman in Caelia by Charles Johnson (1732)
 Sparke in The Miser by Henry Fielding (1733)
 Valeius Publicola in Junius Brutus by William Duncombe (1734)
 Don Lopez in Trick for Trick by Robert Fabian (1735)
 Osmyn in The Christian Hero by George Lillo (1735)
 Chatillon in Zara by Aaron Hill (1736)
 Byron in The Universal Passion by James Miller (1737)
 Ceron in The Fatal Retirement by Anthony Brown (1739)
 Manilus in Regulus by William Havard (1744)
 Siftem in The Astrologer by James Ralph (1744)
 Cardinal Perigot in Edward the Black Prince by William Shirley (1750)
 Philip in The Brothers by Edward Young (1753)
 Xuthus in Creusa, Queen of Athens by William Whitehead (1754)

References

Bibliography
 Highfill, Philip H, Burnim, Kalman A. & Langhans, Edward A. A Biographical Dictionary of Actors, Actresses, Musicians, Dancers, Managers, and Other Stage Personnel in London, 1660-1800: Volume 2. SIU Press, 1975.
 Marshall, Gail & Kishi, Tetsuo.  Lives of Shakespearian Actors, Volume 1. Pickering & Chatto, 2008.

18th-century English people
18th-century British people
English male stage actors
British male stage actors
18th-century English male actors
18th-century British male actors
1706 births
1760 deaths